Cobham Oval is a cricket ground in Whangarei, New Zealand, next to the Okara Park rugby stadium. It stages daytime-only first-class and List A matches. It is the home ground and headquarters of the Northland cricket team and one of the home grounds for the Northern Districts cricket team. It is named after Lord Cobham, New Zealand's Governor-General from 1957 to 1962.

The old Cobham Oval
A previous ground, also called Cobham Oval, situated about 300 metres to the north of the present ground, was officially opened in February 1961 during the two-day match between Northland and the touring Marylebone Cricket Club team. It staged 11 first-class matches between 1966 and 2001. In the early 2000s, the land was sold and used to build a Warehouse retail outlet.

The new Cobham Oval
The new Cobham Oval was built in 2005. Its pavilion is modelled on the pavilion at Lord's in London. It held its first first-class match in 2009, and as of late 2022 it had staged 26 first-class matches.

Cobham Oval became New Zealand's twelfth international cricket venue when a One Day International against Zimbabwe was held on Waitangi Day (6 February 2012). It also hosted a One Day International against West Indies on 20 December 2017.

International centuries
Only one international century has been achieved at the ground.

References

External links
Northland Cricket Association
Cricinfo Profile

2006 establishments in New Zealand
Cricket grounds in New Zealand
Sport in Whangārei
Sports venues in the Northland Region